Snooth is a social networking website based in New York City, United States. It was founded in November 2006 by Philip J. K. James, a graduate of Oxford University and Columbia Business School. The company raised $300,000 in seed financing in December 2006. Snooth has built an online community for wine drinkers; users can research, review and shop for wine on the site.

Awards 
In 2008, Snooth receives the Model of Excellence Award from infoCommerce.

In 2010, Snooth becomes 2010 Wine Blog Awards Finalist.

History
The site has been noted in Decanter (magazine), the New York Daily News, and the New York Post.

In November 2007, the company raised another $1 million from angel investors to expand its operations and merchant relationships.

In 2010, Rich Tomko (former Time Warner/CNN Executive) joined as CEO and focused the company on an ad-supported business model.  Strong revenue growth helped fuel a profitable year in 2012.

In 2013, Snooth's Co-Founder and former CTO Mark Angelillo was named CEO.

References

External links 
Snooth website

American review websites
Wine websites
Companies based in New York City